Pedunculagin is an ellagitannin. It is formed from casuarictin via the loss of a gallate group.

Natural occurrence 
Pedunculagin is found in plants in orders in the clade Rosidae. It can be found the pericarp of pomegranates (Punica granatum), in the family Lythraceae, in the order Myrtales. It is also found in plants in the order Fagales such as walnuts (Juglans regia) in the family Juglandaceae,  in Alnus sieboldiana and in the Manchurian alder (Alnus hirsuta var. microphylla), both species in the family Betulaceae and it is one of the main oak wood ellagitannins along with castalagin, vescalagin, grandinin and roburins A-E (genus Quercus, in the family Fagaceae). It is also found in the Indian gooseberry (Phyllanthus emblica), a plant in the family Phyllanthaceae, in the order Malpighiales.

Galloyl pedunculagin can be found in Platycarya strobilacea.

Research 
Pedunculagin is a highly active carbonic anhydrase inhibitor in vitro.

Chemistry 
A total synthesis of pedunculagin has been reported.

Pedunculagin is an isomer of terflavin B.

References 

Ellagitannins
Pomegranate ellagitannins
Carbonic anhydrase inhibitors